Dan Zimmerman is an American film editor. He is the son of editor Don Zimmerman. He is also the twin brother of Dean Zimmerman.

After glimpses into editorial jobs with his father on films like The Nutty Professor (1996) and The Cat in the Hat (2003), Zimmerman graduated to chief editor with the 2006 film The Omen.

Filmography

References

External links

American Cinema Editors
American film editors
Living people
1974 births
American twins